Juliette N. Kayyem (born August 16, 1969) is an American former government official and author. She is host of the WGBH podcast The SCIF. She is a national security analyst for CNN and is a weekly guest on Boston Public Radio. She is the Belfer Lecturer in International Security at the John F. Kennedy School of Government at Harvard and a member of the Council on Foreign Relations and the Pacific Council on International Policy. She is a former candidate for Governor of Massachusetts and a former Boston Globe columnist, writing about issues of national security and foreign affairs for the op-ed page.

Formerly, Kayyem was the Assistant Secretary for Intergovernmental Affairs in the United States Department of Homeland Security, in the Obama administration. Kayyem has an extensive background in terrorism and national security affairs. Prior to her federal position, she was Massachusetts' first Undersecretary for Homeland Security, where she was responsible for developing statewide policy on homeland security, with a focus on preventing, protecting, responding to, and recovering from critical incidents.

Early life and education
Born in Los Angeles to Lebanese parents, Kayyem graduated from Harvard University with her bachelor's degree in 1991 and from Harvard Law School with a Juris Doctor degree in 1995.

Legal career
Kayyem began her legal career in 1995 at the Department of Justice, ultimately serving as an advisor to Attorney General Janet Reno until 1999.

From 1999 to 2000, Kayyem served as House Minority Leader Richard Gephardt's appointee to the National Commission on Terrorism, a congressionally mandated review of how the government could better prepare for the growing terrorist threat. Chaired by L. Paul Bremer, that commission's recommendations in the year 2000 urged the nation to recognize and adapt to the growing tide of terrorist activity against the United  States.

In October 2017, Kayyem became the chief executive officer of Massachusetts-based Zemcar, an on-demand and scheduled ridesharing company focused on children and seniors. Zemcar discontinued its rideshare services in December 2018.

As of March 2019, Kayyem has been chief executive officer of Grip Mobility - a technology company focused on providing transparency in the rideshare industry.

Academic career
As of fall 2011, Kayyem has returned to the Kennedy School as a lecturer in public policy. She is a member of the Belfer Center for Science and International Affairs board of directors, and Faculty Co-Chair, Dubai Initiative.

Since 2001, Kayyem has been a resident scholar at the Belfer Center, serving both as executive director of the Kennedy School's Executive Session on Domestic Preparedness, a terrorism and homeland security research program, and as co-director of Harvard's Long-Term Legal Strategy for Combating Terrorism. She also taught courses on law and national security.

Government service

Department of Homeland Security
She was appointed as Massachusetts’ first Undersecretary for Homeland Security by Governor Deval L. Patrick in January 2007, overseeing the National Guard, the commonwealth's strategic security planning, and the distribution of homeland security funds consistent with the Governor's priorities.

On March 5, 2009, United States Department of Homeland Security Secretary Janet Napolitano appointed Juliette N. Kayyem Assistant Secretary for Intergovernmental Affairs. As assistant secretary, Kayyem was responsible for coordinated and consistent planning between the department and all of its state, local, tribal, and territorial partners on issues as varied as immigration, intelligence sharing, military affairs, border security, and the response to operational events such as H1N1 influenza outbreak, the December 25th attempted terrorist attack, the Haiti earthquake, and the BP oil spill. In this capacity, she also served as the co-chair of congressionally mandated Preparedness Task Force and  a member of President Obama's Task Force on Puerto Rico and the Defense Department's Council of Governors. She also managed the security efforts surrounding major sporting events, including the Chicago Olympic bid, the Vancouver Olympics, the Caribbean Games, and the World Equestrian Games. She was the most senior Arab-American female appointee in the Obama Administration. She left the DHS in the fall of 2010. On May 7, 2015, United States Department of Homeland Security Secretary Jeh Johnson appointed Kayyem to the Homeland Security Advisory Committee.

In the immediate aftermath of the Deepwater Horizon oil spill, Kayyem was tasked to direct interagency and intergovernmental affairs for the National Incident Command, overseeing a diverse interagency and interdisciplinary staff for the White House and DHS to address unprecedented issues in the response, including public safety, public engagement, environmental remediation, and legal compliance. For her work, she received the Coast Guard's highest civilian honor.

2014 Massachusetts gubernatorial candidacy
In July 2013, it was reported that Kayyem was considering a bid for Governor of Massachusetts in the 2014 election. On August 21, 2013, Kayyem officially announced her candidacy. As a candidate, Kayyem endorsed raising the state minimum wage and an earned sick day mandate for workers.

At the state party convention on June 14, 2014, Kayyem failed to receive the 15% of delegate votes required to make the primary ballot.

Voter registration controversy 
In February 2014, it was reported by The Boston Globe that Kayyem failed to vote in either 2009 and 2010. At the time she was living temporarily in Washington, D.C., and did not ask for an absentee ballot for Massachusetts or register to vote in the District of Columbia.

When asked about her voting record, Kayyem's spokesman initially stated that Kayyem had registered in the District of Columbia during those years. But records later showed that Kayyem was never registered in Washington. When confronted with this evidence, Kayyem's campaign spokesman stated that Kayyem didn't think she could vote in Massachusetts during the time in Washington.

Personal life
Named one of CNN/Fortune Magazines "People to Watch," Kayyem served as an on-air analyst for NBC, MSNBC News, and CNN. Her bi-weekly Boston Globe column is distributed through the New York Times wire service. She was a finalist for the 2013 Pulitzer Prize for Commentary "for her colorful, well reported columns on an array of issues, from women in combat to oil drilling in Alaska." She served on the advisory board of the Qatari-government financed International Centre for Sport Security.

She is married to David J. Barron, a judge on the First Circuit Court of Appeals. They have one daughter and two sons.

Controversies 

NSO Group and Washington Post Controversy

Kayyem is a senior advisor to NSO Group, an Israeli technology firm known for its Pegasus spying tool. The company has been reported to provide spying software that has been used in targeted attacks against human rights activists and journalists in various countries, and played a role in the murder of Saudi dissident Jamal Khashoggi. On October 21, 2019, Kayyem was hired as an opinion contributor by the Washington Post, where Khashoggi worked as a columnist. Observers pointed out the problematic nature of the hire. The director of Citizen Lab, a laboratory that studies human rights abuses and technology told Forbes at the time: "It is a sad day for human rights, a deeply disturbing irony in the wake of Khashoggi’s execution, and a public relations victory for NSO Group, to have the Washington Post hire someone sitting on their advisory board.” Facing mounting criticism, Kayyem stepped down from her Washington Post role just four days later, without 
clarifying her role at NSO Group.

Comments on Canadian trucker blockade

During the blockade of the Ambassador Bridge by truckers in February 2022, Kayyem was accused of promoting vigilantism when she tweeted "The Ambassador Bridge link constitutes 28% of annual trade movement between US and Canada. Slash the tires, empty gas tanks, arrest the drivers, and move the trucks."  Addressing the criticism, she denied the accusation, saying, "People have the freedom to protest. Governments have the responsibility to protect public safety. That was what I intended to say."

Selected work

Books

See also
 Preparedness paradox

References

External links
 

1969 births
American people of Lebanese descent
Harvard Law School alumni
Living people
Massachusetts Democrats
CNN people
The Boston Globe people
United States Department of Homeland Security officials
United States Department of Justice lawyers
Writers from Los Angeles